HMS Meon was a  that served with the Royal Navy and Royal Canadian Navy in the Second World War. The vessel was used primarily as a convoy escort in the Battle of the Atlantic, but also took part in the Invasion of Normandy. After the war, the ship was converted to a headquarters vessel for amphibious operations, and saw service in the Persian Gulf from 1952 to 1965, before being scrapped in 1966. 
She was named for the River Meon in the United Kingdom and was sponsored by the town of Bletchley in Buckinghamshire.

Meon was ordered on 24 January 1942. The ship was laid down on 31 December 1942 by A. & J. Inglis at Glasgow and launched 4 August 1943. She was commissioned into the Royal Navy on 31 December 1943.

War service
After commissioning and trials, Meon sailed with convoy ON 220 to Canada. Once there she was recommissioned into the Royal Canadian Navy at Halifax, Nova Scotia on 7 February 1944. After working up with her new Canadian crew, she joined convoy escort group 9 in May 1944. Following the ship's arrival in Londonderry Port to join the group, the vessel spent until October 1944 in the waters around the United Kingdom. It was during this period that Meon participated in Operation Neptune, the sea component of the invasion of Normandy and was present on D-day.

Arriving at Halifax on 19 October 1944, Meon joined local convoy escort group 27 and was named Senior Officer's ship. She remained with the group until the end of March 1945, when the vessel returned to the United Kingdom and was handed back over to the Royal Navy at Southampton on 23 April 1945.

Postwar service
Following return from the Canadians, Meon was converted at Southampton into a combined operations headquarters ship for use in South-East Asia. The ship's 4-inch guns were removed, as were the Hedgehog anti-submarine mortars, with armament reducing to three Bofors guns, allowing extra communications equipment and accommodation to be added. The conversion was completed in December 1945, and Meon was laid up in reserve at Harwich. After being used as an accommodation ship at Harwich, Meon, still in reserve, moved to Sheerness in 1949.

Meon recommissioned in April 1951, and in July 1952 was transferred to the Persian Gulf to serve as HQ ship for the Amphibious Warfare Squadron (Gulf). In 1953, back in British waters for a refit, Meon took part in the Fleet Review to celebrate the Coronation of Queen Elizabeth II. In 1956 Meon took part in the Suez Crisis, commanding landing craft during Operation Musketeer. In late June 1961, in response to Iraqi threats to annex Kuwait, Meon took part in Operation Vantage, helping landings of British troops and equipment in Kuwait. The vessel remained in the Gulf until 1965. The ship was laid up at Portsmouth until being sold to Hughes Bolckow Ltd and being broken up at Blyth, Northumberland from 14 May 1966.

References

Publications
 
 
 
 
 

 

Ships of the Royal Canadian Navy
1943 ships
Ships built on the River Clyde
River-class frigates of the Royal Navy
Ships built by Harland and Wolff